Dr. Mobley received his Ph.D. at the University of Louisville School of Medicine and conducted postdoctoral work at the University of Maryland School of Medicine in Biochemistry and Vaccine Development, after which he joined the faculty in the Division of Infectious Diseases and rose to the rank of Professor of Microbiology and Immunology.  After 23 years at Maryland, Dr. Mobley was named Chair of the Department of Microbiology and Immunology at the University of Michigan Medical School in 2004, serving in this role until 2019.  Dr. Mobley’s research focuses on uropathogenic E. coli and Proteus mirabilis, but has also studied Helicobacter pylori and Gram-negative bacterial species causing bacteremia including E. coli, Klebsiella pneumoniae, Acinetobacter baumannii, Citrobacter freundii, and Serratia marcescens. (https://medicine.umich.edu/dept/microbiology-immunology/harry-l-t-mobley-phd)

Harry L.T. Mobley is an American microbiologist and Frederick G. Novy Distinguished University Professor of Microbiology and Immunology at the University of Michigan.

Publications. Dr. Mobley has published more that 285 scientific research articles and 50 book chapters: 
Harry Mobley's Bibliography:
 https://www.ncbi.nlm.nih.gov/sites/myncbi/harry.mobley.1/bibliography/41146644/public/?sort=date&direction=decending
His publications have been cited over 38,000 times (h-index=96) https://scholar.google.com/citations?user=8xCZwrIAAAAJ&hl=en

References 

American immunologists
American microbiologists
University of Michigan faculty
Living people
1953 births